Rob Shehadie (born 21 March 1977) is an Australian actor, writer and stand-up comedian, who has featured in television series such as "Pizza", "Swift and Shift Couriers" and "Housos". He has performed numerous stage show comedies across Australia and has made many appearances at schools and charity events. His filmography includes "Fat Pizza", a feature film that broke Australian box office records and "Fat Pizza vs. Housos". Shehadie and Tahir Bilgic created the TV comedy series Here Come the Habibs

Biography and career
Shehadie grew up in Sydney and attended St Patrick's College, Strathfield. Before turning to acting, Shehadie was a full-time Rugby union player. He represented Australia/NSW in schoolboy, under 19s and under 21s level. He also represented Lebanon in rugby league. He was forced to stop the sport due to injuries.

His most notable appearance on television was the role of the character Rocky in "Pizza" and "Housos" on SBS.

He obtained a role on the 7mate's popular series Bogan Hunters in 2014 as one of the celebrity judges.

His other appearances on Australian television include:

"Bondi Rescue" on Network Ten/SC10
"Renovation Rescue" on Nine Network/WIN
"Australian Idol" on Network Ten/SC10
"Footy Show" on Nine Network/WIN
"Here Come the Habibs" on Nine Network
"Street Smart (TV series)" on Network Ten/WIN

In October 2020, Shehadie was announced as a competing celebrity contestant on the fifth season of The Celebrity Apprentice Australia in 2021.

Charity work
Shehadie is an ambassador for Special Olympics Australia, helping athletes with an intellectual disability reach their personal best through participation in sport. He has also assisted Westmead Medical Research Foundation by supporting and hosting the My Westmead Ladies Night and the Cancer Council's Girl's Night In in 2012.

References

External links

  Sydney Morning Herald article on "Pizza"
 Daily Telegraph article on Rob Shehadie with Joe Esposito

Australian male film actors
Australian male television actors
Australian people of Lebanese descent
Living people
Place of birth missing (living people)
Male actors from Sydney
People educated at St Patrick's College, Strathfield
Comedians from Sydney
The Apprentice Australia candidates
1977 births